The 2022 Korea Masters  was a badminton tournament that took place at Gwangju Women's University Stadium in Gwangju, South Korea, from 12 to 17 April 2022 and had a total prize of $180,000.

Tournament
The 2022 Korea Masters was the ninth tournament of the 2022 BWF World Tour and was part of the Korea Masters championships, which had been held since 2007. This tournament was organized by the Badminton Korea Association with sanction from the BWF.

Venue
This international tournament was held at Gwangju Women's University Stadium in Gwangju, South Korea.

Point distribution
Below is the point distribution table for each phase of the tournament based on the BWF points system for the BWF World Tour Super 300 event.

Prize pool
The total prize money was US$180,000 with the distribution of the prize money in accordance with BWF regulations.

Men's singles

Seeds 

 Srikanth Kidambi (withdrew)
 Kunlavut Vitidsarn (withdrew)
 Kantaphon Wangcharoen (withdrew)
 Lu Guangzu (quarter-finals)
 Heo Kwang-hee (second round)
 Sitthikom Thammasin (semi-finals)
 Zhao Junpeng (first round)
 Parupalli Kashyap (withdrew)

Finals

Top half

Section 1

Section 2

Bottom half

Section 3

Section 4

Women's singles

Seeds 

 Chen Yufei (final)
 An Se-young (semi-finals)
 Ratchanok Intanon (withdrew)
 He Bingjiao (champion)
 Pornpawee Chochuwong (first round)
 Busanan Ongbamrungphan (withdrew)
 Michelle Li (first round)
 Yeo Jia Min (quarter-finals)

Finals

Top half

Section 1

Section 2

Bottom half

Section 3

Section 4

Men's doubles

Seeds 

 Ong Yew Sin / Teo Ee Yi (withdrew)
 Ko Sung-hyun / Shin Baek-cheol (quarter-finals)
 Pramudya Kusumawardana / Yeremia Rambitan (first round)
 Bagas Maulana / Muhammad Shohibul Fikri (quarter-finals)
 Leo Rolly Carnando / Daniel Marthin (first round)
 Liu Cheng / Zhang Nan (first round)
 Arjun M.R. / Dhruv Kapila (withdrew)
 Krishna Prasad Garaga / Vishnuvardhan Goud Panjala (withdrew)

Finals

Top half

Section 1

Section 2

Bottom half

Section 3

Section 4

Women's doubles

Seeds 

 Lee So-hee / Shin Seung-chan (withdrew)
 Kim So-yeong / Kong Hee-yong (champions)
 Ashwini Ponnappa / N. Sikki Reddy (withdrew)
 Liu Xuanxuan / Xia Yuting (second round)
 Jeong Na-eun / Kim Hye-jeong (withdrew)
 Laksika Kanlaha / Phataimas Muenwong (second round)
 Vivian Hoo / Lim Chiew Sien (withdrew)
 Catherine Choi / Josephine Wu (second round)

Finals

Top half

Section 1

Section 2

Bottom half

Section 3

Section 4

Mixed doubles

Seeds 

 Wang Yilyu / Huang Dongping (champions)
 Seo Seung-jae / Chae Yoo-jung (withdrew)
 Tan Kian Meng / Lai Pei Jing (withdrew)
 Goh Soon Huat / Shevon Jemie Lai (semi-finals)
 Ko Sung-hyun / Eom Hye-won (first round)
 Rinov Rivaldy / Pitha Haningtyas Mentari (second round)
 Adnan Maulana / Mychelle Crhystine Bandaso (first round)
 Chan Peng Soon / Toh Ee Wei (second round)

Finals

Top half

Section 1

Section 2

Bottom half

Section 3

Section 4

References

External links
 Tournament Link

Korea Masters
Korea Masters
Korea Masters
Korea Masters